Parsabad and Bilesavar is the 2nd electoral district in the Ardabil Province of Iran. It has a population of 226,950 and elects 1 member of parliament.  This district was combined with Germi district from 1st to 5th Iranian legislative election and named the electoral district of Mugan.

1980
MP in 1980 from the electorate of Mugan. (1st)
 Mohammadreza Rashed

1984
MP in 1984 from the electorate of Mugan. (2nd)
 Matlab Dashti

1988
MPs in 1988 from the electorate of Mugan. (3rd)
 Habib Boromand Dashghapu

1992
MP in 1992 from the electorate of Mugan. (4th)
 Firuz Ahmadi

1996
MP in 1996 from the electorate of Mugan. (5th)
 Hassan Almasi

2000
MP in 2000 from the electorate of Parsabad and Bilesavar. (6th)
 Hassan Almasi

2004
MPs in 2004 from the electorate of Parsabad and Bilesavar. (7th)
 Soleyman Fahimi

2008
MP in 2008 from the electorate of Parsabad and Bilesavar. (8th)
 Vakil Sepah

2012
MP in 2012 from the electorate of Parsabad and Bilesavar. (9th)
 Habib Boromand Dashghapu

2016

Notes

References

Electoral districts of Ardabil Province
Bileh Savar County
Parsabad County
Deputies of Parsabad and Bilesavar